Chadwick Von Slaughter (born June 4, 1978) is a former American football offensive tackle. He was signed by the Dallas Cowboys as an undrafted free agent in 2000. He played college football at Alcorn State.

Slaughter has also been a member of the New York Jets, Oakland Raiders, Baltimore Ravens and Jacksonville Jaguars.

Early years
Slaughter attended Kimball High School in Dallas, Texas, and was a three-sport standout in football, basketball, and track and field. In football, he was an All-District honoree as both an offensive and defensive lineman. He was also an All-District honoree in basketball and in track and field as a shotputter.

Life after football
After Slaughter left the NFL, he then began working at Trinidad Garza Early College High School in 2011. Slaughter teaches Entrepreneurship, Sports and Entertainment Marketing, and Business Management.

External links
Baltimore Ravens bio
Jacksonville Jaguars bio
Oakland Raiders bio

1978 births
Living people
American football offensive tackles
Alcorn State Braves football players
Dallas Cowboys players
New York Jets players
Oakland Raiders players
Baltimore Ravens players
Jacksonville Jaguars players
Players of American football from Dallas